The 2007–08 Pacific-10 Conference men's basketball season ended with six teams participating in the 2008 NCAA Men's Division I Basketball Tournament, two teams playing in the National Invitation Tournament (NIT) and one team playing in the College Basketball Invitational (CBI).

The UCLA won the regular season & conference tournament championship and Stanford head coach Trent Johnson was named coach of the year.

Only three teams, UCLA, UCLA (#2), Stanford (#11) and Washington State (#21) finished the season in the ESPN/USA Today Coaches Poll. They were #3, #11, and #21 respectively in the "AP Top 25" polls. In the final post-NCAA tournament coaches' poll, UCLA dropped to #4, Stanford stayed at #11 and Washington State moved up to #15.

Pre-season
Hall of fame basketball coach Lute Olson, who had been the head coach of the Arizona Wildcats for 24 seasons, had to take a personal leave of absence and Kevin O'Neill took over for the season in an interim basis.

Pac-10 teams participated in the Pac-10/Big 12 Series. They also took part in other x-season tournament games, including the College Basketball Experience Classic, the NIT Season Tip-Off in Madison Square Garden and the Anaheim Classic in the Anaheim Convention Center.  Arizona State played in the Maui Invitational Tournament.

Conference games

Oregon was first in scoring offense, field goal percentage and 3-point field goal percentage while Washington State was first in scoring defense.  Stanford was first rebounding while California was first in free throw percentage in conference games.  UCLA was on top in scoring margin.  Arizona led the conference in attendance with a total of 241,703 in 17 games, averaging 14,218 (14,545 capacity).

Conference tournament

UCLA, the #1 seed team, won the 2008 Pacific Life Pacific-10 Conference men's basketball tournament at the Staples Center in Los Angeles, California on March 15, in front of a crowd of 18,672. The team defeated #2 seed Stanford and won the school's third tournament championship.  The Bruins received the conference's automatic bid to the NCAA National Tournament.

* Denotes a vacated win, as the result of a January 3, 2010 announcement that USC has vacated all wins during the 2007–2008 season, including its Pac-10 Conference tournament victory over Arizona State (therefore, USC finished the season with a record of 0–12).

Postseason
Six Pac-10 teams participated in the 2008 NCAA Men's Division I Basketball Tournament. Three teams won their first-round games and all three would go on to play in their regional semi-finals. UCLA would go on to advance to the Final Four, their 18th Final Four in school history.  They would go on to lose to the Memphis Tigers 63–78.

Arizona State and California played in the NIT.  Arizona State lost in their regional Quarterfinals against Florida 57–70.  California lost in the Second round to Ohio State 56–73.

Washington played in the College Basketball Invitational (CBI), where they would lose their opening round game 71–72 to Valparaiso.

Highlights and notes
Oregon State fired head coach Jay John after the Beavers started 0–6 in conference, he only had 1 winning season in five and half years at Oregon State.  Kevin Mouton took over in the interim for the remainder of the season.

Two days after losing to Ohio State in the 2008 NIT, California fired head coach Ben Braun and would be replaced by former Stanford head coach Mike Montgomery.

On April 10, 2008, Stanford basketball coach announced he was leaving the program for LSU.  On April 27, former Duke assistant Johnny Dawkins would becoming the 17th head coach in Stanford basketball history.

In October 2008, Arizona Wildcats hall of fame coach Lute Olson would announce his retirement from the sport due to health reasons.  He ended his career at Arizona with a 589–187 record, four final fours and one national title.  The 589 wins would be a conference record and amassed 780-280 overall, which at the time was 10th most in wins all time.  Russ Pennell became the interim head coach on October 24.

Awards and honors

All-Americans

Kevin Love (C, Freshman), of UCLA was named to the 2008 Consensus All-America first team. He was listed on the Associated Press, the USBWA, and the Sporting News All-American lists to qualify for the "Consensus All-America".  Ryan Anderson (PF, Sophomore), of California was a Sporting News Second team All-American.  Darren Collison, (PG, Junior) was an Associated Press Third team All-American.

The following players from Pac-10 were honored on the AP All American list:

First Team (Player, School, Ht, Wt, Yr, Key stats)
 Kevin Love, UCLA, 6–10, 260, Fr., 17.5 ppg, 10.6 rpg, 1.9 apg, 29.6 min., 55.9 fg pct

Second Team (Player, School, Ht, Wt, Yr, Key stats)
 Ryan Anderson, California, 6–9, 240, So., 21.1 ppg, 9.9 rpg, 1.4 apg, 32.8 min., 49.0 fg pct

Third Team (Player, School, Ht, Wt, Yr, Key stats)
 Darren Collison, UCLA, 6–1, 160, Jr., 14.5 ppg, 2.6 rpg, 3.8 apg, 34.7 min., 48.1 fg pct
 
Honorable mention (Player, School)
 Jerryd Bayless, Arizona
 Jon Brockman, Washington
 James Harden, Arizona State
 O. J. Mayo, USC

All-Pac-10 teams

Regular season honors: 
 Player of The Year: Kevin Love, UCLA
 Freshman of The Year: Kevin Love, UCLA
 Defensive Player of The Year: Russell Westbrook, UCLA
 Coach of The Year: Trent Johnson, Stanford

First team 

(Name, School, Pos, Yr, Ht, Wt, Hometown (Last School))
 Ryan Anderson, CAL, F, So., 6–9, 240, El Dorado Hills, Cali. (Oak Ridge)
 James Harden, ASU, G, Fr., 6–5, 218, Los Angeles, Calif. (Artesia HS)
 Brook Lopez, STAN, F, So., 7–0, 260, Fresno, Cali. (San Joaquin Memorial)
 Kevin Love, UCLA, C Fr., 6–10, 260, Lake Oswego, Ore. (Lake Oswego)
 O.J. Mayo, USC, G, Fr., 6–5, 210, Huntington, W.V. (Huntington High School)
Second team 
 Jerry Bayless, ARIZ, G, Fr., 6–3, 200, Phoenix, Ariz. (St. Mary's)
 Jon Brockman, WASH, F, Sr., 6–7, 255, Snohomish, Wash. (Snohomish HS)
 Darren Collison, UCLA, G, Jr., 6–0, 160, Rancho Cucamonga, Calif. (Etiwanda HS)
 Maarty Leunen, ORE, F, Sr., 6–9, 180, Redmond, Ore. (Redmond)
 Kyle Weaver, WSU, G, Sr., 6–6, 200, Beloit, Wisc. (Beloit Memorial)
Third team 
 Chase Budinger, ARIZ, F, So., 6–7, 218, Encinitas, Calif. (LaCosta Canyon HS)
 Taj Gibson, USC, F, So., 6–9, 215, Brooklyn, N.Y. (Calvary Christian)
 Derrick Low, WSU, G, Sr., 6–2, 175, Honolulu, Haw. (ʻIolani School)
 Jeff Pendergraph, ASU, F, Jr., 6–9, 240, Etiwanda, Calif. (Etiwanda HS)
 Russell Westbrook, UCLA, G, Fr., 6–3, 187, Lawndale, Cali (Leuzinger)

All-Academic

The 2007–08 Pacific-10 Conference Men's Basketball All-Academic teams (minimum 3.0 overall grade-point average and be either a starter or significant contributor):

First Team (School, Year, GPA, Major)
 Bret Brielmaier, ARIZ, Sr., 3.04,	Interdisciplinary Studies
 Robbie Cowgill, WSU, Sr. 3.36, Management Operations
 Taj Finger, STAN, Sr., 3.06, Communication
 Daven Harmeling, WSU, Jr., 3.51, Health and Fitness Education
 Taylor Rochestie, WSU, Jr. 3.27, Communication

Second Team (School, Year, GPA, Major)
 Alfred Aboya, UCLA, Jr. 3.06, Political Science
 Aron Baynes, WSU, Jr., 3.15, Movement Studies
 Nikola Knezevic, CAL, So., 3.21, Interdisciplinary Studies
 Nikola Koprivica, WSU, So., 3.31, Undeclared
 Roeland Schaftenaar, OSU, Jr., 3.17, Pre-Business

Robbie Cowgill, of Washington State, was named a Pacific-10 Conference winter Scholar-Athletes of the Year.

References

2007-08